Abra is a financial services and technology company that operates a cryptocurrency wallet service including a trading service for buying and selling cryptocurrencies, a service for earning interest on cryptocurrencies and stablecoins, and a lending services for borrowing against cryptocurrency collateral.

History 

Abra was founded in 2014 in the Silicon Valley by Bill Barhydt, a former fixed income analyst for Goldman Sachs and former director of Netscape.

Abra operates a cryptocurrency wallet with a built-in crypto swap service called Abra Trade, a crypto lending service called Abra Borrow, and a crypto staking service called Abra Earn.

In March 2018, Abra added support for 20 new cryptocurrencies including Litecoin, Bitcoin Cash and Stellar.

In September 2021 Abra announced that it had raised an additional $55M in Series C funding bringing its total raised to date to over $85M.  Investors in the financing included American Express Ventures, Blockchain Capital, Kingsway Capital and CMT Digital Ventures. 

Abra and Barhydt started the YouTube series Money Talks. Interviews have included Ethereum founder Vitalik Buterin, MicroStrategy CEO and Bitcoin supporter Michael Saylor, Bitcoin Cash supporter Roger Ver, Zcash creator Zooko Wilcox, Bitwise CEO Hunter Horsley, and venture capitalists Tim and Adam Draper. 

In June 2018, Abra was listed in The Wall Street Journal as one of the "Top 25 Tech Companies to Watch in 2018".

In 2021 Forbes named Abra one of its next Billion-Dollar Startups.

See also
 Cryptocurrency exchange
 Cryptocurrency wallet

References

External links
Official website

American companies established in 2014
Companies based in Mountain View, California
Bitcoin exchanges